Saint-Jean-d'Estissac (Limousin: Sent Joan d'Estiçac) is a commune in the Dordogne department in Nouvelle-Aquitaine in southwestern France.

Population

Local Committees

Environment/Clean up

President : Gérard Mathias
Patrice Marty
Thomas Messager
Anne-Marie Molieres
Philippe Chambost

Finances

President : Marie-Rose Veyssiere
Patrice Lagarde
Pierre Bannes

Roads

President : Patrice Lagarde
Gérard Mathias
Thomas Messager
Patrice Marty

Community buildings

President : Pierre Bannes
Christine Bernazeau
Jocelyne Manteau
Gérard Naboulet
Gérard Mathias
Philippe Chambost

Information communication

President : Christine Bernazeau
Patrice Marty
Anne-Marie Molieres
Thomas Messager

Cemetery management

President : Gérard Naboulet
Pierre Bannes
Gérard Mathtas
Patrice Lagarde

Community Services
Schools in RPI with Issac and Villamblard

Library

In the Town Hall – opening hours the same as the secretariat

Beleymas – Lagudal waste collection centre

Monday and Wednesday all day
Saturday morning:
April 1 to October 30 from 9 a.m. to noon and from 2 to 6 p.m.
November 1 to March 31 from 9 a.m. to noon and from 1 to 5 p.m.

Community Facilities

Community room for 70 to 80 persons

Statistics
Detailed Statistics of the city of Saint Jean d'Estissac are results from the 2005 collection

Population Data

Of the 146 residents 49.3% men and 50,.% women.
The number of singles was: 25.8% of the population.
Married couples 57.8% of the population. Divorced were 10.2%
The number of widows and widowers was 6,3% in Saint Jean d'Estissac

Economic Data

The rate of activity was 67% in 2005 and 59.5 in 1999
The unemployment rate in 2005 was 20.3% and in 1999 it was 23.4%
Retired and pre-retired accounted for 37% of the population in 2005 and 28% in 1999

Contact

Address: Le Bourg 24140 Saint Jean d'Estissac
Phone: 05 53 81 96 86
Fax: 05 53 81 25 31
Email: mairie.saintjeandestissac@wanadoo.fr

See also
Communes of the Dordogne department

References
Conseil General
Pays De Bergerac

Communes of Dordogne